The General Organization of Radio and TV, also known as from French Organisation de la Radio et la Télévision Arabe Syrienne  (in short ORTAS), is the state and public broadcaster in Syria and reports to the Ministry of Information. Earlier names were Radio and Television (RTV Syria) and Syrian Radio & Television (SRT).

The legal basis is a legislative decree from 2010, which, however, was largely not implemented. Sūmar Wassūf became head of the commission in December 2018.

Several television channels and radio stations are being run by this organization, including Syria TV and Damascus Radio. ORTAS is an active member of the Arab States Broadcasting Union (ASBU), associate member of the European Broadcasting Union (EBU) and formerly a member of International Radio and Television Organisation (OIRT).

Services
The General Authority for Radio and Television is the governmental body responsible for radio and television broadcasting in Syria. It is divided into two parts:

Radio

Radio broadcasting began in the First Syrian Republic upon its independence on 17 April 1946 on shortwave. As early as 1942, Radio Damas, a counterpart to Radio Levant in Beirut, Lebanon existed in the French League of Nations mandate.

Nationwide radio programs include:

 دمشق, Iḏāʿa Dimašq – Radio Damascus (since 1947)
 صوت الشباب, Ṣaut aš-Šabāb – voice of youth (since 2002)
 سوريان, Sūryānā (since 2015)
 Radio Amwaj FM
 Al Karma FM
 Cham Radio
 صوت الشعب, Ṣaut aš-Šaʿb – voice of the people (1979–2017)

Regional radio programs are (from north to south):
Radio Waves, in Latakia
Radio Tartus
Radio Zenobia, in Homs
Radio Vine, in As-Suwayda

The international broadcaster Radio Damascus has existed since 1957. According to the frequency announcements in the program, both FM (VHF) and AM (medium wave) are broadcast.

Television

The television station is based in Damascus, Syria since July 1960. The channel airs programmes in Arabic, English and French. It was broadcast in black and white until 1976. A second channel was added in 1985 (discontinued in 2012 due to the civil war) and in 1996, the satellite service Syria TV began broadcasting. On September 5, 2012, Syrian Television channel broadcasts were broken off on Arabsat and Nilesat, including Syria TV. Syria TV and Syrian Drama TV broadcasts were stopped on Hot Bird on October 22, 2012.

The digital television switchover (DVB-T) in Syria has been restarted since mid-2018, in the provinces of Damascus, Daraa, As Suwayda, Rif Dimashq, Tartus, Latakia, Quneitra and Hama, however there is still no date for an analog disconnect.

ORTAS satellite television channels:
Noor Al-Sham (religion; since 2011) – The channel intends "to convey a broad and genuine understanding of Islam and its legal rules", according to the Syrian Arab News Agency (SANA).
Syria TV (since 1995), also known as Syrian Satellite Channel
Syrian Drama TV (since 2009)
Syrian Education TV (since 2008)
Syrian News Channel, also known as Alikhbaria Syria or Al-Ikhbariyah Syria (since 2010)
 (since 2014) – a regional channel from Latakia; Latakia Radio and Television Center was established in 1987 for the hosting of the 1987 Mediterranean Games

Former channels include Syrian Medical TV and Talaqie TV which both closed in 2016; terrestrial channels Channel 2 and Channel 1 (now Syria TV) closed down in 2012.

The Syria Insider Weekly program is broadcast in English, French and Spanish. Russian television news is broadcast daily.

See also
 Mass media in Syria

References

External links
 
 www.rtv.gov.sy (former homepage, archived in 2003)

1960 establishments in Syria
Mass media companies established in 1960
Mass media companies of Syria
Mass media in Damascus
State media
Radio in Syria
Television companies of Syria
Government-owned companies of Syria
Multilingual broadcasters
Arabic-language radio stations
Arabic-language television stations
European Broadcasting Union members